Guayakí Sustainable Rainforest Products, Inc., more commonly known as Guayakí, is an organic beverage company specializing in yerba mate products based in Sebastopol, California. In addition to offering loose-leaf yerba mate, Guayakí also sells canned as well as carbonated yerba mate drinks, and energy shots. Guayakí receives American-nationwide distribution to approximately 10,000 stores, primarily through organic and health-oriented grocery stores such as Whole Foods among other retailers, as well as through online channels.

About 
Guayakí was founded in 1996 as a CalPoly San Luis Obispo senior project by Alex Pryor and David Karr.

In 2018 Guayakí's mission was, in part, to "steward and restore 200,000 acres of rainforest and create over 1,000 living-wage jobs by 2020" in the Atlantic Forest through their own "Market Driven Restoration" model, the idea that imperialism and colonialism as a result of the market for products from less-developed countries can be combatted using the market itself. 

The name Guayakí comes from the Indigenous Aché people of Paraguay, who are ancestral consumers of the mate plant. In the interest of social and environmental responsibility, the company works with the Aché people to conserve the rainforest habitat they dwell in and harvest mate. Guayakí pays the community for the use of its name.

Guayakí is California's first B Corporation, certified organic by USDA Organic; Additionally, the company is also certified fair trade by IMO and is a member of Fair Trade Federation, and the first yerba mate company to achieve biodynamic certification.

In April, 2021, the brand announced Stefan Kozak will step in as the new CEO of the company. Kozak is the former CEO of Red Bull North America.

References

External links
 
 Bloomberg Business company profile

1996 establishments in California
Certified B Corporations in the Food & Beverage Industry
Drink companies based in California
Companies based in Sonoma County, California
Fair trade organizations
Organic farming organizations
Organizations established in 1996
Yerba mate